Maple Pictures Corporation was the distribution arm of Alliance Films. It was formed on April 13, 2005 when Lionsgate demerged to two companies—Lions Gate Entertainment and Maple Pictures (formerly the original incarnation of Lionsgate Films). Maple Pictures was the official distributor for Lionsgate's films and video library throughout Canada.

Background
The company describes itself as a "genre-savvy independent film company making a mark on the industry through its grassroots acquisition, production and distribution of diverse and distinctive filmed entertainment". Maple also has an extensive home video catalogue, which was built up largely by Lions Gate Entertainment's acquisition of several other independent studios. Their logo from 2005 depicts the company's name smothered in concentric circles & rings, whose font is set in Helvetica Bold.

Maple even used to distribute LeapFrog and HIT Entertainment kids' DVDs.

In 2008, Maple Pictures acquired the rights to distribute Miramax films which Alliance Films lost acquisition to earlier in 2007. On August 10, 2011, Alliance Films bought Maple Pictures from Lions Gate Entertainment (Maple's former owner) for a sum of 38.5 million dollars. On January 9, 2013, Entertainment One acquired Alliance, and then on December 30, 2019, American toy and media company Hasbro (after having tried and failed to acquire Lionsgate) acquired eOne. This made Hasbro the corporate parent of Maple Pictures, which it remains to this day.

Television DVD Releases
Mad Men
Weeds
Nurse Jackie
Crash
Tyler Perry's House of Payne
Saved by the Bell (Universal Television)
Will & Grace (Universal Television)
According to Jim (ABC Studios)
Reaper (ABC Studios)
My Wife & Kids (ABC Studios)
ALF
Teenage Mutant Ninja Turtles
Dead Zone
Saturday Night Live (Universal Television)
Unsolved Mysteries
Iron Chef

Films released
Dirty Dancing
Basic Instinct
Terminator 2: Judgment Day
Bad Boys
Reservoir Dogs
Rambo 
The Eye
Bug
Leonard Cohen: I'm Your Man
The Descent
Death of a President
Saw
Saw II
Saw III
Saw IV 
Saw V
Saw VI
March of the Penguins
Employee of the Month
The U.S. Versus John Lennon
The Devil's Rejects
House of 1000 Corpses 
The Descent 
The Devil's Rejects 
Leonard Cohen: I'm Your Man 
Crank 
Employee of the Month 
Good Luck Chuck
The U.S. Versus John Lennon 
See No Evil 
Mistress of Spices
Dreamland
Natural Born Killers
3:10 to Yuma
Crash
W.
Atlas Shrugged
The Bank Job
Punisher: War Zone
Young People Fucking 
The Forbidden Kingdom 
Meet The Browns 
Doubt 
Transporter 3
Happy-Go-Lucky
The Boy in the Striped Pajamas  
The Spirit 
Choke
Repo! The Genetic Opera
My Best Friend's Girl
Bangkok Dangerous
Hulk Vs
The Lucky Ones
The Boondock Saints II: All Saints Day
My Bloody Valentine 3D 
Adventureland 
Pontypool 
Crank: High Voltage 
The Haunting in Connecticut 
Hunger  
Gamer 
The Imaginarium of Doctor Parnassus
Whatever Works
Kick-Ass
The Switch
The Expendables
Saw 3D
The Con Artist
Burke and Hare
Buried
Hard Candy

References

External links
 

Entertainment One
Lionsgate
Former Lionsgate subsidiaries
Home video companies of Canada
Mass media companies established in 2005
Mass media companies disestablished in 2011
Film distributors of Canada
2011 mergers and acquisitions